Ehenas is a Maldivian drama web television series developed for Baiskoafu by Ravee Farooq, based on the 2012 novel Ehenas Hama Loabiveyey by Ahmed Iqbal. Produced by Ahmed Iqbal under IQ Productions, the series stars Mohamed Vishal, Aishath Rishmy, Ahmed Maseeh, Fathimath Sara Adam, Mohamed Yunaan and Sheela Najeeb in pivotal roles. The film follows the experiences of a long-term domestic and sexually abused male victim and how he faces the societal obstacles of marriage.

Cast and characters

Main

 Mohamed Vishal as Ahmed Niyaz (Season 1-2)
 Aishath Rishmy as Shaira (Season 1-2)
 Ahmed Maseeh as Rayan (Season 1)
 Fathimath Sara Adam as Shazu (Season 1-2)
 Aminath Shamana as Neena (Season 1-2)
 Ahmed Sharif as Shinaz (Season 1-2)
 Aminath Silna as Leeza (Season 1-2)
 Mariyam Waheedha as Zidhu (Season 1-2)
 Ali Nadheeh as Farey (Season 1-2)
 Mohamed Yunaan as Hamdhan (Season 1-2)
 Sheela Najeeb as Shakeela (Season 1-2)
 Mohamed Manik as Ibrahim Zahir (Season 1-2)
 Abdulla Azman as Farish (Season 2)
 Aminath Shuha as Zoya (Season 2)
 Washiya Mohamed as Pink (Season 2)
 Nathasha Jaleel as Farzana (Season 2)

Guest

 Mariyam Haleem as Sobira (Season 1-2)
 Ali Shazleem as Majid Saleem (Season 1-2)
 Mohamed Yamin Ali as Shamin (Season 
1)
 Adam Saeed as a Bully (Season 1, Episode 1)
 Fathimath Rihla as Rihu (Season 1)
 Ali Usam as Nafiz (Season 1-2)
 Aminath Rasheedha as Shaira's mother (Season 2)
 Mohamed Shaif as Hamza; Leeza's boyfriend (Season 1-2)
 Shaushan Mohamed as Ina (Season 1)
 Hawwa Neesha as Shiru (Season 1)
 Niuma Mohamed as Rayan's aunt (Voice-over) (Season 1; 3 episodes)
 Ahmed Saeed as Rayan's counselor (Voice-over) (Season 1; 2 episodes)
 Mira Mohamed Majid as a wedding performer (Season 1)
 Ali Farooq as Clergyman (Season 1)
 Ismail Jumaih as Fayaz (Voice-over) (Season 1)
 Abdulla Wimfaz as a cab driver and Rayan's Bodube (Voice-over) (Season 1)
 Ismail Naseer as Shaaira's father (Season 2)
 Nuzuhath Shuaib as an office colleague (Season 2)
 Ali Azim as an office colleague (Season 2)
 Aminath Rishfa as Zeba Muhusin (Season 2)
 Ravee Farooq as Sohail; Niyaz's interviewer (Season 2)
 Musthafa Hakeem as Sohail's secretary (Season 2)
 Ahmed Azmeel as a doctor (Season 2)
 Meyna Hassan as Judge (Season 2)
 Hamdhan Farooq as Lawyer (Season 2)
 Yune Mohamed Yunaan as Neen's daughter (Season 2)

Episodes

Season 1

Season 2

Development

Story
Ahmed Iqbal initiated penning the first draft of Ehenas Hama Loabiveyey in 2009 when he was posting stories on blogs. In need of trying a different genre than his previous fictions, Iqbal focused the novel on major three themes; sexual abuse to men, domestic violence and bullying. In an interview Iqbal said; "I initially struggled to develop the story considering the fact that its themes are labelled to be disgusting in the Maldivian culture". After posting three to four episodes of his narration, Iqbal received positive comments from readers and decided to build the story further.

Production
On 11 March 2016, it was announced that a new production studio, Me studio, has acquired the rights to develop a film based on Ahmed Iqbal's 2012 novel, Ehenas Hama Loabiveyey. The production team expressed their interest to produce the film due to the "lukewarm response" the novel has received despite its "fragile issue" the original story touches upon. They projected to start filming in May 2016 and release the film before the year ends. However, on 30 January 2019, it was reported that the producers later changed the project to be developed as a web series rather than a feature film, citing the idea of expanding the story and hence "incidence can be fully elaborated and justified" in a series without being "trimmed" for a film. A casting call was opened for interested actors on the same day by actress Aishath Rishmy. Workshops were held for those actors who were selected to star in the film from the audition. Director, Ravee Farooq revealed that majority of the actors are newcomers though the film will feature established actors like Sheela Najeeb and Mohamed Manik. Filming for the series began on 15 February 2019.

Soundtrack

Release
The teaser trailer of the series was released on 24 March 2019. The official trailer came out on Youtube on 20 April 2019. The first episode of the show was streamed on 16 July 2019.

Response
The series opened to mainly positive reviews from critics. Aishath Maahaa reviewing from Dho? praised the realistic portrayal of mother-son relationship and acting performance of the newcomers; "At the helm of Ravee's brilliance, aided by stellar debut performances, Ehenas is an excellent product in overall". Ifraz Ali from Dho? ranked the series in the third position of the year's best projects while particularly praising the first season for its suspense and the whole project for carefully maintaining a standard similar to the Hollywood television releases. However, with inclusion of characters beyond its book, the second series was found to be "a little problematic" for him with repeated dialogues and lagged character developments.

References

External links 
 

Serial drama television series
Maldivian web series